Charlie Mitchell (December 28, 1920 – April 2, 1999) was a defensive back in the National Football League. He was drafted in the twenty-eighth round of the 1944 NFL Draft by the Chicago Bears and later played with the team during the 1945 NFL season. The following season, he played with the Green Bay Packers.

References

1920 births
1999 deaths
People from Creek County, Oklahoma
Chicago Bears players
Green Bay Packers players
American football defensive backs
Tulsa Golden Hurricane football players